was a pioneering animator who helped develop the art of anime in Japan. Studying the animation techniques of Sanae Yamamoto, Murata produced dozens of mostly educational films at the Yokohama Cinema studio featuring such characters as Momotarō and Norakuro. Along with Noburō Ōfuji, he was renowned as a master of cutout animation. Among his students were such animators as Yoshitarō Kataoka.

Selected filmography
Dōbutsu Orinpikku taikai, 1928 [Animal Olympics]
Tarō-san no kisha, 1929 [Taro's Train]
Saru Masamune, 1930 [The Monkey Masamune]
Oira no yakyū, 1930 
Sora no Momotarō, 1931
Norakuro gochō, 1934

References

External links

1896 births
1966 deaths
Japanese film directors
Japanese animators
Silent film directors
Articles containing video clips